is a Japanese professional baseball pitcher for the Sultanes de Monterrey of the Mexican League. He previously played in Japan's Nippon Professional Baseball (NPB) for the Chunichi Dragons and Saitama Seibu Lions.

Career

Chunichi Dragons
Ogawa debuted for the Chunichi Dragons on October 20, 2011. Through early 2018, he split time between the main Dragons club, and their minor league team in the Western League. In NPB, Ogawa had a 1–3 record with 53 strikeouts.

Saitama Seibu Lions
On July 23, 2018, Ogawa was traded to the Saitama Seibu Lions. Through 2021, he posted a 7–2 record with a 3.82 ERA and 49 strikeouts. 

He became a free agent following the 2021 season.

Sultanes de Monterrey
On January 25, 2022, Ogawa signed with the Sultanes de Monterrey of the Mexican League. He only made 1 start, pitching 3 innings and giving up 3 earned runs. He was released by the club on April 26, 2022.

Personal life
Ogawa was born to a Filipino mother and Japanese father.

References

External links

1991 births
Living people
People from Chiba (city)
Japanese baseball players
Japanese people of Filipino descent
Nippon Professional Baseball pitchers
Chunichi Dragons players
Saitama Seibu Lions players
Baseball people from Chiba Prefecture
Japanese expatriate baseball players in Mexico
Sultanes de Monterrey players